1st Parachute Battalion may refer to:

 1 Parachute Battalion, a South African Army unit
 1st Battalion, Parachute Regiment, a British Army unit
 1st Parachute Battalion (Australia)
 1st Parachute Battalion (Belgium)
 1st Parachute Battalion (Hungary)
 1st Parachute Battalion, 1st Marine Parachute Regiment, a former U.S. Marine unit
 1st Canadian Parachute Battalion